The following is a list of Portuguese-language films.

At Midnight I'll Take Your Soul (1964)
Awakening of the Beast (1970)
Central Station (1998)
Behind the Sun (2001)
Bus 174 (Ônibus 174) (2002)
Carandiru (2003)
City of God (2003)
The Forest (2002)
Juventude em Marcha (2006)
Lower City (2006)
Lula, o filho do Brasil (2010)
Madame Satã (2002)
Nise: O Coração da Loucura (2015)
No Quarto da Vanda (2000)
Normais, Os - O Filme (2003)
Ossos (1997)
The Three Marias (2002)
This Night I Will Possess Your Corpse (1967)
Tropa de Elite (2007)
Adão e Eva (1995)
Call Girl (2007)
Arte de Roubar (2008)
balas e bolinhos (2001)
As bodas de Deus (1999)
Branca de Neve (2000)
A carta (1999)
Contraluz (2010)
Complexo: Universo Paralelo (2010)
dot.com (2007)
Kilas, o mau da fita (1980)
Non ou a Vã Glória de Mandar (1990)

See also
List of Brazilian films
List of Portuguese films

External links

 
Portuguese